Do Rah-e Ghomashkeh (also Romanized as Do Rāh-e Ghomāshkeh; also known as Do Rāh) is a village in Sadat Mahmudi Rural District, Pataveh District, Dana County, Kohgiluyeh and Boyer-Ahmad Province, Iran. At the 2006 census, its population was 490, in 109 families.

References 

Populated places in Dana County